Louisa Michelle Christian (born March 18, 1973) is an American voice actress and ADR script writer at Funimation and Seraphim Digital/Sentai Filmworks. She has provided many voices for English versions of Japanese anime series and films.

Life and career
Christian grew up in Texas, where her parents, Mike and Barbara, were high school teachers. From age 3 to 9, she participated in some local beauty pageants, and later got involved in theater programs in high school. In college, she originally pursued journalism, but changed to theatre when she was offered a scholarship. She got her bachelor's degree in Theatre from Angelo State University in San Angelo, Texas, and her Master of Fine Arts in Theatre at the Louisiana State University in Baton Rouge, Louisiana.

Her involvement in anime starts in ADV Films in Houston where she had some bit parts in Those Who Hunt Elves that involved about three hours of studio time. She did not hear back for some time until she got cast in Neo Ranga. A few weeks later, she auditioned and got her first starring role as Kaname Chidori in Full Metal Panic!. In Super Gals! Ran Kotobuki, she voices the title character who is a fun-loving teenage gal in a family of police officers. In Prétear, she voices main character Himeno Awayuki, a teenage girl who ends up living with two stepsisters and becomes involved in a magical girl fantasy. She also voiced teacher Yukari Tanizaki in the school life comedy Azumanga Daioh. In 2006, she was featured in a series of articles by IGN titled "Babes of ADV Voice-Over".

Christian joined the voice actors who would regularly travel from Houston to record with Funimation in Dallas. She had supporting roles in Fullmetal Alchemist as guest character Psiren and later as the recurring character Wrath. She voiced actress Asako Kurumi in Funimation's dub of Kodocha, and a lead role as Rico in the girls-with-guns drama Gunslinger Girl. In 2006, she voiced lead character Asuna Kagurazaka in the school anime Negima, which is about a boy magician who teaches at an all-girls middle school. Theron Martin of Anime News Network remarked that she interpreted her role much like Kaname Chidori on Full Metal Panic. She also landed the lead role of Tenma Tsukamoto in the comedy School Rumble, voiced the supporting role of Hitomi Kashiwa in Welcome to the NHK, and voiced the youthful-looking Mitsukuni "Honey" Haninozuka in Ouran High School Host Club. After Funimation acquired the dubbing rights for the long-running One Piece anime series, Christian was selected to play its lead female navigator Nami.

In 2007, the American Anime Awards nominated her for Best Actress for her work in Princess Tutu as the lead role of Ahiru, and Best Actress in a Comedy for her work in Desert Punk, Negima and Nerima Daikon Brothers, but lost to Mary Elizabeth McGlynn and Debi Derryberry, respectively.

In 2009, she voiced Kirino Chiba, the captain of a kendo team in Bamboo Blade and Lenalee Lee in the fantasy series D.Gray-man. In 2010, she voiced as Nagisa Furukawa in the Clannad series, the title character in Birdy the Mighty Decode and Makina Hoshimura from Corpse Princess.  She voiced Medusa in the Soul Eater anime series, which was released on video in 2010 and later broadcast on Cartoon Network in 2013.  In 2011, she voiced Meryl Strife in the English dub of anime feature film Trigun: Badlands Rumble.  In 2012, she voiced Nessa in Fractale, served as the narrator for Ōkami-san and her Seven Companions and Kamisama Kiss, and voiced companion devil Elsie in The World God Only Knows. In 2013, she voiced main characters Marika Kato in Bodacious Space Pirates, and Himeko Inaba in the body-swapping anime series Kokoro Connect. In 2016, she voiced Ochaco Uraraka in My Hero Academia. Christian voiced Chihaya Ayase in Sentai Filmworks' English dub of the adaptation of Yuki Suetsugu's manga series Chihayafuru. Also in 2017, she had starring heroine roles as Hestia in Is It Wrong to Try to Pick Up Girls in a Dungeon? and Touko Nanami in Bloom Into You.

Personal life
Christian is married to Michael Bell. They have two daughters. She has a brother, Kevin Christian, who ran for a seat in the Texas Legislature in 2006.

Filmography

Anime

Animation

Film

Video games

Other media

Notes

References

External links
 
 
 
 Luci Christian at the CrystalAcids Anime Voice Actor Database
 

1973 births
Living people
Funimation
20th-century American actresses
21st-century American actresses
Actresses from New Orleans
Actresses from Houston
American television writers
American voice actresses
American women screenwriters
Angelo State University alumni
Louisiana State University alumni
Writers from Houston
People from San Angelo, Texas
American women television writers
Screenwriters from Texas
Screenwriters from Louisiana
Writers from New Orleans